, also known as the Ishinomaki Mangattan Museum, is a museum in Ishinomaki, Miyagi Prefecture, Japan. It opened in 2001 to commemorate the works of manga artist and author Shotaro Ishinomori, who was born in what would become the present day Ishinomaki City. It sits on the bay facing the Pacific Ocean and Tashirojima, a.k.a. "Manga Island".

After the 2011 Tōhoku earthquake and tsunami, though still standing, the Ishinomori Manga Museum was closed for repairs before reopening on November 17, 2012. The following year, they had a renewal ceremony that included actors Hiroshi Fujioka and Yuki Sato as well as singer Ichirou Mizuki, who have all been involved in works created by Ishinomori.

References

External links

 Ishinomaki Manga Museum Website

Biographical museums in Japan
Museums in Miyagi Prefecture
Art museums established in 2001
Literary museums in Japan
Anime and manga museums in Japan
2001 establishments in Japan
Ishinomaki